Dharasena was a Traikutaka ruler of the Konkan coast. He was the son of the Traikutaka ruler Indradatta and succeeded him as king. He is known to have performed an ashwamedha horse sacrifice  and was succeeded by his son Vyaghrasena.

Reign
King Dahrasena expanded his realm, which soon bordered the Vakataka realm. This led to conflict and the Vakataka king Narendrasena, who with the help of his son & crown prince Prithivishena, probably defeated the Traikutikas, as later king Prithivishena's inscriptions refer to him twice rescuing the "sunken fortunes of his family".

See also
Abhira dynasty
Konkan
Kumaragupta I

References 

5th-century Indian monarchs